Khaldoon Khalifa Al Mubarak (born 1975) is an Emirati Government official and business leader. Al Mubarak holds senior positions within the Government of Abu Dhabi, including as: a member of the Executive Council since 2006, a member of the Supreme Council for Financial and Economic Affairs, and as the founding chairman of the Executive Affairs Authority.  He also fulfills responsibilities for the UAE Federal government and has served as Presidential Special Envoy to the People's Republic of China since 2018.

Al Mubarak is chief executive officer and managing director of Mubadala Investment Company. He is also chairman of Manchester City FC, Melbourne City FC and Mumbai City FC. Al Mubarak is on the board of the UAE business ADNOC, and serves as the Chairman of the Boards of the Emirates Nuclear Energy Corporation, Abu Dhabi Commercial Bank, and Emirates Global Aluminium.

Early life
Al Mubarak was born on 1 December 1975 in Abu Dhabi, United Arab Emirates. 
He is from a family of diplomats, religious and judicial scholars. Khaldoon's father was the former UAE diplomat and ambassador to France, Khalifa Ahmed Abdulaziz Al-Mubarak, who was assassinated in Paris in 1984. 
Khaldoon's grandfather was the late (Al Sheikh) Ahmed Abdulaziz Hamad Al-Mubarak, former Judge and Chairman of the Shari'a Judicial Department in the Emirate of Abu Dhabi, he was appointed by founder of the UAE and ruler of Abu Dhabi, Sheikh Zayed bin Sultan Al Nahyan. His great-grandfather Professor (Al Sheikh) Abdulaziz Hamad Al-Mubarak, a judicial scholar, also played a significant role to the UAE educational system, where he established the country's first school in the Emirate of Dubai; he was an advisor to Sheikh Zayed bin Khalifa Al Nahyan.

Khaldoon has three siblings, two of whom are senior government officials: Rasha; Razan Khalifa Al Mubarak, managing director and board member of the Environment Agency Abu Dhabi and the managing director for the Mohamed bin Zayed Species Conservation Fund; and Mohamed Khalifa Al Mubarak, Chairman of Department of Culture and Tourism Abu Dhabi and member of the Executive Council of the Emirate of Abu Dhabi, and Chairman of Aldar Properties PJSC.

Khaldoon attended the American Community School of Abu Dhabi. In 1997, he obtained a degree in Economics and Finance from Tufts University.

Career 
Al Mubarak has worked for the state-owned Abu Dhabi National Oil Company, and the UAE Offsets Group. He was executive vice-president-corporate of Dolphin Energy.

Al Mubarak has interests in mining projects in South America, specifically in Colombia, as he directs the state-owned Mubadala Investment Group, the company that owns Minesa, a company created in 2013 to obtain the exploitation license, from the Colombian government, to extract gold from the Páramo de Santurbán, Soto Norte province, Santander department, with reserves calculated in the subsoil of approximately 9 million ounces. There has been fierce opposition from environmentalists and political leaders in the region due to the threat posed by the contamination of the water reserve that nourishes more than 4 million inhabitants, a product of possible mismanagement that Minesa gives to the cyanide and mercury residues necessary to extract the gold as well as the destruction of the páramo ecosystem, becoming even a matter of national and international interest. However, the investment made in the country during the 2010s, seeking the favor of the government and productive sectors of the country in favor of the exploitation of the páramo, is being put at risk as Minesa's request is filed by the National Environmental Licensing Authority (ANLA in spanish), declaring deficient the Environmental Impact Study in the area made by the mining company. After an appeal process by Minesa, the ANLA ordered in January 2021 the final file of the environmental license for the mining megaproject.

Al Mubarak was appointed CEO and managing director of the government-owned investment company Mubadala Development. In 2017 he was appointed managing director and chief executive officer of the Mubadala Investment Company, after Mubadala Development merged with International Petroleum Investment Company (IPIC). In March 2020, Mubadala Investment Company was managing a $230 billion portfolio. The company owns stakes in numerous companies, including a 5 percent share in Ferrari, an 8.1 percent share in AMD, and a 7.5 percent share in the Carlyle Group. In May 2005, he was appointed vice-chairman of Oasis International Leasing, an Abu Dhabi-based leasing company. Through Mubadala Investment Company, Al Mubarak is vice-chairman of Piaggio Aero, and vice-chairman of LeasePlan. During Al Mubarak's tenure Mubadala invested into new markets, among them projects of Brazilian magnate Eike Batista.

He has been characterized as "one of the royal family’s most trusted advisers" and having "a close relationship with the Crown Prince Mohammed bin Zayed Al Nahyan." When the Abu Dhabi government was restructured in 2006, Al Mubarak became chairman of Executive Affairs Authority and a member of the Executive Council for the Emirate of Abu Dhabi. He is also an Abu Dhabi Education Council member, a director of the Abu Dhabi Council for Economic Development (ABCED), and chairman of the Organization & Administration Department. Al Mubarak is co-chair of the United States Chamber of Commerce's US–U.A.E. Business Council, which was established in 2007, chairman of the Abu Dhabi Media Zone Authority, and vice-chairman of the Abu Dhabi Urban Planning Council which was established in 2007.

Al Mubarak is also a board member of the Supreme Petroleum Council (SPC) of the Government of Abu Dhabi and the chairman of the Emirates Nuclear Energy Corporation (ENEC), Abu Dhabi Commercial Bank. He is also co-chair of the Abu Dhabi-Singapore Joint Forum. Within the UAE, Mubarak is considered to be one of the key investors, and plays a major role in the Economic diversity plan to move away from oil and put more focus into aerospace, manufacturing and utilities. He sits on boards including ALDAR Properties, the Emirates Foundation and the First Abu Dhabi Bank, which was formed by a merger of First Gulf Bank and National Bank of Abu Dhabi. He is the chairman of Emirates Global Aluminum (EGA), an aluminum conglomerate. Al Mubarak is chairman of the advisory board for the Global Manufacturing and Industrialisation Summit (GMIS), which is a joint initiative by the UAE Ministry of Economy and the United Nations Industrial Development Organization (UNIDO). In 2018, Al Mubarak was appointed as the first Presidential Special Envoy to China by UAE President Sheikh Khalifa bin Zayed.

Al Mubarak is a member of the Board of Trustees for New York University, and oversaw the development of a campus in Abu Dhabi. Al Mubarak was the first chairman of board of Imperial College London Diabetes Center (ICLDC) which opened in Abu Dhabi in 2006.

Sports

Motorsport
Al Mubarak, as chairman of the Abu Dhabi Motor Sport Management Company (ADMM), worked to bring auto racing to the region and negotiated the deal with FIA for the Abu Dhabi Grand Prix Formula One motor race. The deal was officially announced in early 2007 at the Abu Dhabi F1 Festival in the UAE.

Football
In early September 2008, and after negotiations led by Dubai-born businessman Sulaiman Al-Fahim on behalf of the Abu Dhabi side, the owners of English Premier League football club Manchester City, including chairman Thaksin Shinawatra, agreed to sell the entirety of their shares to Sheikh Mansour bin Zayed Al Nahyan of Abu Dhabi. On Tuesday 23 September 2008, the deal was concluded and the shares were transferred to Abu Dhabi United Group, a United Arab Emirates-based private equity firm owned by Sheikh Mansour, in a deal that was both welcomed and questioned by some observers. In September 2008, the new owner appointed Al Mubarak as chairman of the board of directors of the club, with Garry Cook as Chief Executive. Cook would later resign in 2011 and be replaced by Ferran Soriano

On 14 May 2011, City won the F.A. Cup, their first silverware after a drought of 35 years, by beating Stoke City F.C. 1–0 at the final. On 13 May 2012, with two goals scored in stoppage time in the last game of the season, played at their home stadium, and amidst "scenes of near bedlam," Manchester City were crowned champions of the Premier League, winning the top-division title again, for the first time since the 1967–68 season. The club's finances reached a loss of £98 million loss in 2011–12 but improved to show an £11 million profit in 2014–15, and then in the 2015–16 season a profit of £20.5 million with "record" revenues of £398.1 million.

Since 2013, Mubarak is also the chairman of City Football Group, a holding company that invests in and manages various international football-related businesses, including Manchester City FC, New York City FC, Mumbai City FC and Melbourne City FC. In 2019, the City Football Group decided under his leadership to sell a 10 per cent stake to Silver Lake for $500 million.

In February 2023, Manchester City was alleged by the Premier League, which concluded a four year long investigation, of contravening more than 100 rules on various occasions, most of which relating to finances. The league said City provided misleading information about their finances for a nine-year period under Al Mubarak and Sheikh Mansour and an independent commission would review the case. Premier League’s charges included 80 alleged breaches concerning the financial rules between 2009-18 and 30 breaches were related to City’s failure in co-operating with Premier League’s investigation since December 2018. Manchester City subsequently released a statement stating that they were "surprised" by the allegations, however welcomed the appointment of an independent commission and "look forward to this matter being put to rest once and for all".

Honours
Manchester City (17)
Premier League (6): 2011–12, 2013–14, 2017–18, 2018–19, 2020–21, 2021-22
FA Cup (2): 2010–11, 2018–19
Football League/EFL Cup (6): 2013–14, 2015–16, 2017–18, 2018–19, 2019–20, 2020-21
FA Community Shield (3): 2012, 2018, 2019
Mumbai City (03)
Indian Super League
Championship (1): 2021
Premiership (2): 2020-21, 2022-23
Durand Cup :
Runners-up(1): 2022

Personal life
Al Mubarak is married to Nadia Sehweil. The couple first met when they were both in high school, and they have three children. Nadia, who is of Palestinian descent, runs a yoga, pilates, and dance studio called Bodytree Studio in Abu Dhabi with her mother.

In 2007, Al Mubarak was made Commander of the Star of the Order of the Italian Solidarity for supporting the "economic relationship" between Italy and the UAE. In 2013, he was made a Commander of the Order of the British Empire (CBE) and received the Grand Gwanghwa Medal, the highest class of the South Korean Order of Diplomatic Service Merit. Al Mubarak is a recipient of the Asian Business Leadership Forum's (ABLF) Award in 2016. He was named as one of the 100 world's most influential and powerful Arabs in 2017 and 2018 by Arabian Business.

References

Emirati chief executives
Tufts University School of Arts and Sciences alumni
Emirati football chairmen and investors
Manchester City F.C. directors and chairmen
Living people
Emirati Muslims
Emirati urban planners
Year of birth uncertain
Emirati expatriates in the United States
1976 births